Edward L. Jones (December 12, 1943 – September 16, 2014) was an American voice actor and television host.

He is probably best known from his roles as Black Vulcan in Super Friends, Blaster in The Transformers, Doc in G.I. Joe: A Real American Hero and Winston Zeddemore in The Real Ghostbusters (replacing Arsenio Hall) and later Extreme Ghostbusters.

He was born in Paris, Tennessee. He attended Lane College in Jackson, Tennessee, where he played in a band and got a job as a disc jockey. During his career as a DJ he worked in Washington, D.C. and in Los Angeles. He also did voice work in commercials, which led to his career as a voice actor in TV series.

Jones appeared as the host of Soul Unlimited, Dick Clark's short-lived all-black version of American Bandstand that Clark had created as an answer to Soul Train.

He also provided voices for Defenders of the Earth (as Lothar), The Super Globetrotters (as Spaghetti Man), Captain Planet and the Planeteers and The New Batman Adventures.

Jones died at home in North Hollywood, California on September 16, 2014 at age 70.

Animated roles
 G.I. Joe: A Real American Hero - Doc (G.I. Joe) & Zap (G.I. Joe)
 The Transformers - Blaster (Transformers)
 Super Friends - Black Vulcan
 The Real Ghostbusters - Winston Zeddemore Jones replaced Arsenio Hall as the voice of Winston on The Real Ghostbusters in the fourth season. He later reprised the role for a guest spot on Extreme Ghostbusters in 1997.
 Batman: The Animated Series - Additional Voices

References

External links
 

1943 births
2014 deaths
American male voice actors
American radio DJs
People from Paris, Tennessee
African-American male actors
Male actors from Tennessee
20th-century African-American people
21st-century African-American people